Petr Barna (born 9 March 1966) is a Czech former competitive figure skater who competed for Czechoslovakia. He is the 1992 European champion, the 1992 Olympic bronze medalist, and a seven-time Czechoslovak national champion.

Personal life 
Barna was born 9 March 1966 in Prague. In 1990, he married ice dancer Andrea Juklová, with whom he has a daughter, Sofie Barnová, born in April 1992.

Career 
Barna started skating in Prague at an outdoor rink and received lessons in 1972. He began appearing at senior internationals in the 1982–83 season. He was coached by František Pechar.

Barna sprained his right ankle as he was leaving the airport in Birmingham on his way to the 1989 European Championships. Despite the injury, he medaled for the first time at an ISU Championship, winning bronze.

1991–92 was Barna's best competitive season. He won gold at the 1992 European Championships and a bronze medal at the 1992 Winter Olympics in Albertville, France. He landed a quad toe loop in his free skate. He is the first man to land a quad jump in Olympic history.
He also received the first 6.0 for artistic expression in the history of the long program.

After placing sixth at the 1992 World Championship, Barna retired from amateur competition. He then spent almost ten years as a professional skater, performing in the Champions on Ice tour and World cup tour, as well as competing in World professional competitions, ESPN Legends, Miko Masters, and other events. He preferred amateur competition, saying, "In amateur skating, it matters how you skate. In professional, it matters how you dance. And I don't dance. I liked amateur skating better."

Barna works as a coach in Oberstdorf, Germany, and has also appeared in several television skating programs.

Results

References

External links

Navigation 

1966 births
Czech male single skaters
Czechoslovak male single skaters
Figure skaters from Prague
Figure skaters at the 1988 Winter Olympics
Figure skaters at the 1992 Winter Olympics
Living people
Olympic bronze medalists for Czechoslovakia
Olympic figure skaters of Czechoslovakia
Olympic medalists in figure skating
European Figure Skating Championships medalists
Medalists at the 1992 Winter Olympics
Universiade medalists in figure skating
Universiade gold medalists for Czechoslovakia
Competitors at the 1987 Winter Universiade